
Gmina Dobczyce is an urban-rural gmina (administrative district) in Myślenice County, Lesser Poland Voivodeship, in southern Poland.

Villages
Apart from the town of Dobczyce, Gmina Dobczyce contains the villages and settlements of Bieńkowice, Brzączowice, Brzezowa, Dziekanowice, Kędzierzynka, Kornatka, Niezdów, Nowa Wieś, Rudnik, Sieraków, Skrzynka, Stadniki and Stojowice.

Neighbouring gminas
Gmina Dobczyce is bordered by the gminas of Gdów, Myślenice, Raciechowice, Siepraw, Wieliczka and Wiśniowa.

References
Polish official population figures 2006

Dobczyce
Myślenice County